Voortman may refer to:

Voortman Cookies, Canadian cookie manufacturing company
Linda Voortman, Dutch politician